Guerilla Welfare was an independent electronic music duo from Edmonton, Alberta, active from 1986 to 1995. The principal members were Brian Schultze and Curtis Ruptash, both of whom previously were members of Stony Plain Records recording artists Subtle Hints.

The duo produced music from processed acoustic and electric instruments with spoken word and field recordings of acoustic "world" instruments and singing samples. The resulting sound was a pan-ethnic, experimental sound. One critic wrote: "Their pan-global, multi-media palette supported zeitgeist commentary — often, with a healthy dose of gallows humour — on gender, power structures, and sexual and geopolitical tensions. Their DIY bunker studio experimentations align them with genre defying dub-infused outfits like African Head Charge, Dome, Lifetones, Naffi, Woo, Negativland and The Residents."

The pair released three albums through their own label, He-Dead Records.  Two compilation albums were later produced on other labels.

Guerilla Welfare - 1986
Their first album, Guerilla Welfare, was released in 1986. The budget for the album was $2700.00; only 500 copies were printed and the covers were silk-screened by hand. The tracks "Aggression", "Mistah Bo He Dead" and "Atom Bomb" did well, particularly on North American campus radio. "Atom Bomb" was used in an episode of MTV's The Real World. They found independent records stores and distributors in Canada, and US and the UK. They had few performances, but did play at the 1986 Edmonton Fringe Festival.

Rhesus Pieces - 1988
In 1988, the album Rhesus Pieces included three guest vocalists--singers Mandy Cousins and Denise Spitzer, and the Edmonton artist Patrick Higgins. The singles "Melting Pot", "Is Everything OK?" and "Mr. Mighty (On the Floor)" did very well on North American campus radio stations. That year, they contributed a previously-unrecorded song "Growth?" to the Driven Element compilation put together by Edmonton campus radio station CJSR. They also teamed up with poet Mary Howes, filmmaker Jane Evans and dancer Debra Shantz and Mile Zero Dance for a multimedia performance at Calgary's The New Gallery.

Evidence I Was Here - 1991
In 1990, Mary Howes book Vanity Shades was released and Guerilla Welfare supported her at her bookstore readings--she read her poems over their tracks. Her publisher, Red Deer College Press, licensed the recordings and issued them on cassette with the book's first editions. Guerilla Welfare released them in their 1991 album Evidence I Was Here. The singles "Rock-A-Bye", "Easy Street", "Cobalt" and "Box Factory" became underground hits.

Following that release, Curtis Ruptash moved to Chicago and became a record producer; Brian Schultze stayed in Edmonton and opened a store, Avenue Guitars.

In 2016, Soundpoint issued the complete Guerilla Welfare catalogue in an album called Eye-Holes Off-Center. In 2019, Musique Plastique released a curated compilation of Guerilla Welfare songs called The Nature of Human Nature.

On June 11, 2021, to celebrate its 30th anniversary, Guerilla Welfare re-issued its debut album on all streaming platforms.

Discography

Albums
1986 - Guerilla Welfare (He-Dead Records)
1988 - Rhesus Pieces (He-Dead Records)
1991 - Evidence I was Here(He-Dead Records)

Compilations
1988 - Driven Element (CJSR Radio) (one song)
2016 - Eye-Holes Off-Center (Soundpoint)
2019 - The Nature of Human Nature (Musique Plastique)

References

External links
Profile - Discogs
 Entry at Canadian Pop Encyclopedia

Canadian electronic music groups
Musical groups from Edmonton
Musical groups established in 1986
Musical groups disestablished in 1995
1986 establishments in Alberta
1995 disestablishments in Alberta